Karet Bivak is a cemetery in Jakarta, Indonesia. It is the second largest in the city.

Description
Karet Bivak is located in Central Jakarta, Jakarta. In 2007 it contained approximately 48,000 graves. The graves of poor people are located in a special block at the back of the graveyard.

, the cemetery is at full capacity. To deal with the lack of graveyard space, common throughout Jakarta, families have begun using a single plot for several family members, stacking them on top of each other. Another method proposed is reassigning the 18,000 graves that have been abandoned or have had their lease run out.

Maintenance is done by self-employed gravekeepers, who receive funds from the families of those interred. The gravekeepers generally do not attend to the graves of families who do not pay them.

Although the cemetery is often devoid of visitors, during Ramadhan, the cemetery is often filled with pilgrims and families visiting the dead.

History

In 2009 the government of Jakarta began the plakatisasi program to ensure the graves in Karet Bivak followed the rules for gravestones as outlined by a 2007 bylaw. By September 2009 the government had replaced 2,000 graves with plain gray tombstones and grassy mounds. The head of the Jakarta Parks and Cemetery Agency, Ery Basworo, noted that the program was also to improve water retention in the city and to eliminate the “spooky” perception of cemeteries. Although the government stated that families were notified, some families of those interred were not. The mass-produced new gravestones 
at times misspelled the names of the interred.

Notable interments

Benyamin Sueb, actor and singer
Bing Slamet, actor, comedian, singer, and songwriter
Chairil Anwar, poet
Chairul Saleh, politician
Fatmawati, wife of Sukarno and National Hero of Indonesia
HIM Damsyik, dancer and actor
Hadi Thayeb, diplomat and co-founder of the Ministry of Foreign Affairs
Iwan Tirta, batik fashion designer
Lies Noor, actress
Mimi Mariani, actress, model, and singer
Mohammad Hoesni Thamrin, nationalist and National Hero of Indonesia
Nurbani Yusuf, lawyer, politician, actress, and model.
Sumitro Djojohadikusumo, economist

References
Footnotes

Bibliography

Cemeteries in Jakarta